Köln Geldernstraße/Parkgürtel station is a railway station situated at Bilderstöckchen, Cologne in western Germany. It is served by line S11 of the Rhine-Ruhr S-Bahn. In the peak hour line S6 ends in Köln-Worringen instead of Köln-Nippes.

An adjacent underground station links the station with the Cologne Stadtbahn KVB light rail network.

The station is also served by bus lines 121, 127 and 147.

References

S11 (Rhine-Ruhr S-Bahn)
Railway stations in Cologne
Rhine-Ruhr S-Bahn stations
Cologne KVB stations
Nippes, Cologne
Railway stations in Germany opened in 1975